Huaneng Renewables Corporation Limited is a Chinese electricity generation company. It is a subsidiary of Chinese state-owned enterprise China Huaneng Group. It mainly generated electricity from wind farm, according to the company.

, the market capitalization of Huaneng Renewables' H shares was HK$16.955 billion.

History
Huaneng Renewables started its first initial public offering in 2010. However, the firm withdrawn the application and re-applied in 2011. On 10 June 2011 Huaneng Renewables listed its H shares on the Stock Exchange of Hong Kong.

See also
 Huaneng Lancang River Hydropower, sister listed company
 Huaneng Power International, sister listed company

References

External links
  

China Huaneng Group
Wind power companies of China
Companies listed on the Hong Kong Stock Exchange
H shares
Companies based in Beijing